Chondrostega vandalicia is a moth of the  family Lasiocampidae. It is endemic to the Iberian Peninsula.

They are weak fliers. Females have reduced wings and are incapable of flight. Adult males are on the wing from August to September.

The larvae can be found from November to April and mainly feed on grass species such as Nardus stricta, Festuca and Anthoxanthum aristatum, but also other low growing plants such as Hypochaeris radicata.

External links
Animalandia

Lasiocampidae
Moths of Europe
Moths described in 1865